West Kingston is an unincorporated village and traditional county seat of Washington County, Rhode Island. It is the site of the Kingston Railroad Station Amtrak station, and is a part of the Town of South Kingstown.

Overview
Although unincorporated, West Kingston has a post office and recognized mailing address location. It shares ZIP code 02892 with much of western South Kingstown, a large portion of Richmond, Rhode Island to the west, and small parts of Exeter, Rhode Island to the north. However, West Kingston is not a part of the latter two towns.

The William C. O'Neill Bike Path starts in the village of West Kingston at the train station, and runs through most of South Kingstown, ending in Narragansett.

See also
Scouting in Rhode Island

References

Villages in Washington County, Rhode Island
Villages in Rhode Island